Wayanad may refer to:
 Wayanad district, a district in Kerala
 Wayanad Lok Sabha constituency, a constituency in Kerala